Gebretsadik Abraha Adihana (born 16 July 1992) is an Ethiopian long-distance runner. In 2019, he won the Guangzhou Marathon held in Guangzhou, China setting a new course record of 2:08:04.

Achievements

References 

Living people
1992 births
Place of birth missing (living people)
Ethiopian male long-distance runners
Ethiopian male marathon runners
21st-century Ethiopian people